Saint-Gladie-Arrive-Munein is a commune in the Pyrénées-Atlantiques department in south-western France.

The commune was created by the merger of Saint-Gladie, Arrive and Munein on May 12, 1841.

See also
Communes of the Pyrénées-Atlantiques department

References

Communes of Pyrénées-Atlantiques